The Siraf of Kangan County is a district (bakhsh) in Kangan County, Bushehr Province, Iran. At the 2016 census, its population was 21,288.  The District has one city: Bandar Siraf. The District has two rural districts (dehestan): Taheri Rural District and Shirinu Rural District.

References 

Districts of Bushehr Province
Populated places in Kangan County